West Sandwick is a settlement on the island of Yell, Shetland Islands, Scotland. It is one of the few settlements in the west of the island.

West Sandwick contains one of the major recreational beaches in Yell.

The area south of Southladie Flo is an important feeding area for locally breeding red-throated divers. The rare curved sedge (Carex maritima) grows beside an exit stream on West Sandwick beach.

The bay contains a distinctive shingle spit known as the Urabug.

References

External links

Art UK - West Sandwick, Yell, by Tamar Williamson
Keep Scotland Beautiful - Beach Awards - West Sandwick

Villages in Yell, Shetland